"The Motown Song" is a song performed by British singer Rod Stewart featuring American vocal group the Temptations. The song is from Stewart's 16th studio album, Vagabond Heart (1991). It was written by Larry John McNally and was originally recorded by McNally for the soundtrack to the film Quicksilver in 1986. McNally recorded a new version 2015 for the compilation I. C. Independent Celebration, Vol. 1 for the German label Birdstone Records.

Released on 3 June 1991, the single peaked at number 10 on both the UK Singles Chart and the US Billboard Hot 100. In Canada, the song number one on the RPM Top Singles chart on 5 October 1991. It also reached number three on the Billboard Adult Contemporary chart and number one on the RPM Adult Contemporary chart.

Music video

A music video for the song was produced by Animation City, an animation company in London, England, directed by Derek Hayes. It followed the success of the Madonna video "Dear Jessie", and Elton John's "Club at the End of the Street", by the same company. The video, set in an unnamed city, depicts live-action and animated versions of Stewart gathering neighbors together for a party on the rooftop of an apartment building. 

It paid tribute to Motown (featuring animated versions of the Temptations, the Supremes and former Motown artist Michael Jackson) and featured other headline-making stars of the time, including animated versions of rapper Vanilla Ice, and singers Sinéad O'Connor, Madonna and Elton John. Several comical mishaps befall these artists; Vanilla Ice gets buried under a truckload of ice cubes, O'Connor slips while shaving her head and has to wear bandages over the resulting nicks, Madonna gets her dress ripped off in a car door and shows up for the party in her underwear, and Jackson falls into an open manhole while doing the moonwalk. At the end of the video, the animation is crumpled up as a sheet of paper by the live-action Stewart, who has been drawing the scene in an art studio. He kicks the paper ball into a trash can, picks up his jacket, and leaves with a smile.

 Director: Derek Hayes
 Producer: Maddy Sparrow
 Animators: Jimmy Farrington, Andy Goff, Malcolm Hartley, Derek Hayes, Ric Machin, Gaston Marzio, Paul (Robert) Stone.
 Additional Animation: 'A' For Animation
 Production Company: Animation City

Charts

Weekly charts

Year-end charts

References

Rod Stewart songs
1986 songs
1991 singles
Animated music videos
RPM Top Singles number-one singles
Song recordings produced by Richard Perry
Songs written for films
The Temptations songs